Ancyloscelis is a genus of bees belonging to the family Apidae.

The species of this genus are found in America.

Species:

Ancyloscelis apiformis 
Ancyloscelis bonariensis 
Ancyloscelis duckei 
Ancyloscelis ecuadorius 
Ancyloscelis frieseanus 
Ancyloscelis gigas 
Ancyloscelis globulifer 
Ancyloscelis halictoides 
Ancyloscelis hertigi 
Ancyloscelis melanostoma 
Ancyloscelis mesopotamicus 
Ancyloscelis nigricornis 
Ancyloscelis panamensis 
Ancyloscelis romani 
Ancyloscelis romeroi 
Ancyloscelis saltensis 
Ancyloscelis sejunctus 
Ancyloscelis turmalis 
Ancyloscelis ursinus 
Ancyloscelis wheeleri

References

Apidae